

Damascus is the capital of Syria. 

Damascus may also refer to:

Places

United States

 Damascus, Arkansas
 Damascus, Georgia
 Damascus, Maryland
 Damascus, Ohio
 Damascus, Oregon
 Damascus, Pennsylvania
 Damascus, Virginia
 Damascus Township, Wayne County, Pennsylvania, located along New York State Route 97

Elsewhere
 Damascus, New Brunswick, Canada
 Damascus, Queensland, a locality in the Bundaberg Region, Australia
 Damascus Governorate, in Syria
 Damascus Street, a street in Baghdad, Iraq

Other uses
 Damascus (horse), an American Thoroughbred racehorse
 Damascus affair, an incident involving the Jewish community in Damascus in 1840
 Damascus steel, a material used in making blades
 "Damascus moment" or "Damascene moment", in reference to the Conversion of Paul
 Damascus Securities Exchange
 Damson, once known as a Damascus plum
 Damascus College Ballarat, Secondary school in Ballarat, Victoria, Australia
 The 1980 Damascus Titan missile explosion.

See also
 Damascene (disambiguation), an adjective derived from the name of the place in Syria